Manik Chowk is a village in the Indian state of Bihar.

Geography
Manik Chowk is one of the largest village in Bihar. It is situated between Prem Nagar, Garha, Tikauli, and Lalpur. It comes under the block Runni Saidpur of Sitamarhi district. The village consists of three panchayats, namely Manik Chowk Uttari, Manik Chowk Dakshini and Manik Chowk Paschimi. This area has been hit by floods many times. The land is fertile. The area lies to the south of the Himalayas. The Ganges lies to the south. Summers are moderate and the winter is chilly/cold.

Demographics
Manik Chowk is located at the confluence of Mithila. Most of the people common languages are Bajjika and Hindi.

Culture 
Residents participate in cultural events such as Chhath, Eid, Diwali etc.Hindu and Muslim brotherhood can be seen in these cultural events.
For celebrating good corps production people celebrate Sammat in the very morning of the festival Holi

Festival
The major festival of this area is Chhath Puja in which people offer their prayer to Lord Sun. People residing out-of-town or state often come to celebrate Chhath festival. Holi and Durga Puja Diwali are the village's other festivals. Festivals such as Makar Sankranti, Jur Shital Eid, Janmastmi Puja Sarswati Puja are also celebrated.

Economy
The major food crops are rice, wheat,Pulse, and maize. The area is a major producer of sugarcane, tobacco, and other cash crops.  Lentils, Vegetables, sunflower, and mustard are also cultivated. Crop production has given rise to many agriculture-based industries and boosting the economy.

Fruit
Manik Chowk is known for its mango , lichi , papaya , Jamun , Bel  etc. Fruit exports brings foreign currency and boost the village economy .

Culture
Maharani Sthan is in the western end of the village. People from across the Mithila region come to worship the Maharani Mai. Part of Maharani Mandir, Mahadev Mandir, Hanuman Mandir and a public library are there. Mahanth Chauk is known for the Nath Baba Mandir and its Surya Puja at Chhito Pond. The Manik Chowk Bazaar is one of the largest markets in the area. The market provides most of the needs of local people. Other notable places are Basulia Baba Ki Kuti, Mahashay Baba Ki Kuti, Malang Sthan, Sabzi Chowk, M.V.G High School and Badka Inaar bhandari pokhri.

Transport
Manik Chowk is 45 km from Muzaffarpur and 20 km from Sitamarhi, its district headquarters. 

Private and government operators provide bus service to Muzaffarpur, Patna and Sitamarhi.

A railway line passes near Manik Chowk. The nearest station is 1.5 km away at Garha Jn.

A main road connects Manik Chowk at NH77 in Garha.

Education
Manik Chowk has many schools, including convent schools. More than 3 government-run Middle schools primary schools and 3 High school(which are now 10+2) are in the village. The name of high school MVG High School Manik Chowk. It has a separate high school for girls and a Sanskrit college too.

References

Villages in Sitamarhi district